Alfred Clair Haynes (August 31, 1931 – August 25, 2019) was an American airline pilot. He flew for United Airlines, and in 1989, came to international attention as the captain of United Airlines Flight 232, which crashed in Sioux City, Iowa after suffering a total loss of controls. Having recovered and returned to service as a pilot, Haynes retired from United Airlines in 1991, and subsequently became a public speaker for aviation safety.

Early life
Al Haynes was born at 7:20 pm on August 31, 1931 at the family home in Paris, Texas. He was the third child to Herbert Clair Haynes (August 17, 1896 – February 15, 1972) and Fannie Temperance Baker (April 12, 1896 – July 30, 1991).  His father worked as a district manager of a telephone company and his mother was a homemaker.  By 1940, the family relocated to Dallas, Texas, where Haynes attended Woodrow Wilson High School. Haynes graduated from Texas A&M College (now Texas A&M University) prior to joining the United States Marine Corps. He became a first lieutenant and was an instructor pilot. He served until 1956 and then joined United Airlines, which was his employer for the next 35 years. He retired in 1991.

Career

Military career

Haynes lost his draft deferment while taking a semester off from Texas A&M, while the United States was engaged in the Korean War, and decided to join the U.S. Marine Corps.  He spent four years in the Marine Corps, serving as a pilot.

United Airlines flying career

In 1956, Haynes joined United Airlines after his wartime service. For most of his career with United Airlines he served as a flight engineer or co-pilot, refusing offers of promotion, because they would have required relocating from Seattle. However, in 1985, he did accept a promotion to Captain, because he would be approaching retirement soon, and his retirement pay would be based on his pay during his last five years.

On July 19, 1989, Haynes was the Captain of United Airlines Flight 232, piloting a DC-10, a large trijet airliner, carrying 296 passengers and crew.  The airplane had left Denver for Chicago, with a final destination of Philadelphia, but experienced a catastrophic engine failure in its rear engine, which triggered a loss of hydraulic fluid.  Without hydraulic fluid Haynes and his flight crew could not move the airplane's flaps and rudder or almost any other control surfaces.

Without flight controls the airplane began a right descending turn, a tendency that persisted for the rest of the flight. Haynes reduced the thrust on the left engine (#1), allowing differential thrust from the right engine (#3) to level the aircraft. An off-duty pilot, Dennis Edward Fitch, joined Haynes and his co-pilot, William Roy Records, and flight engineer Dudley Joseph Dvorak, on the flight deck.

The airplane was diverted to Sioux City for an emergency landing.  With his very limited ability to control the airplane, Haynes had difficulty aligning with a runway, reducing speed and landing nose-up.  Consequently, the airplane approached the runway at almost twice the desired landing speed resulting in a very hard landing with catastrophic damage to the airframe.  The airplane then broke into pieces as it slid off the runway with the remaining fuel bursting into flames. As can be heard in the cockpit flight recording, it was the intervention of Fitch that ultimately got the airplane to the airport.

184 people survived the crash-landing.  32 died of smoke inhalation, 80 died of traumatic injuries.  Haynes and his colleagues were trapped in the cockpit.  Thirty minutes after the crash-landing rescuers identified the cockpit and rescued the flight crew. Most had minor injuries apart from Denny Fitch, who almost died having suffered multiple fractures and other organ injuries.  Haynes believed five factors contributed to the degree of success in Sioux City; luck, communications, preparation, execution, and cooperation.

Haynes resumed flight duty after his recovery.

Career after United Airlines

According to NPR, "Haynes is widely seen as a hero among aviation experts, akin to Chesley "Sully" Sullenberger and his 'miracle on the Hudson.'"

He was also a volunteer umpire for Little League Baseball for more than 33 years and a stadium announcer for high school football for more than 25 years. He was an umpire in the 1978 Little League World Series.

He was referred to as a hero, but refused to say he was one. He gave all the credit to the flight attendants, who he believed did not receive enough credit for the work they did.

Awards
 Smithsonian Wall of Honor 
 Dr. Earl Weiner Award

Death
Haynes died on August 25, 2019, in a Seattle hospital after a brief illness, six days before his eighty-eighth birthday, and thirty-seven days after the 30th anniversary of the UA232 incident. 
United Airlines issued a statement thanking him for "his exceptional efforts aboard Flight UA232".

References

1931 births
2019 deaths
Aviators from Texas
Commercial aviators
Survivors of aviation accidents or incidents
People from Paris, Texas
Texas A&M University alumni
United States Marine Corps officers
United Airlines people
Military personnel from Texas